Șimand is a commune in Arad County, Romania. It is situated in the contact zone of the Arad and Criș Plateaus, on the Canalul Morilor and  stretches over 10,089 hectares. It is composed of a single village, Șimand, situated at 30 km from Arad.

Population
According to the last census the population of the commune counts 4144 inhabitants. From an ethnical point of view it has the following structure: 87.2% are Romanians, 4.8% Hungarians, 7.0% Roma, 0.9% Germans and 0.1% are of other or
undeclared nationalities.

History
The first documentary record of the locality Șimand dates back to 1290, although traces of inhabitance of the commune's territory date from older times. A necropolis originating from the 1st century B.C.-the 1st century A.D. has been excavated here in which amber ornaments, lead mirrors and a Dacian ceramic pot have been found.

Economy
Agriculture is the main economic branch of the commune, farming, vegetable growing and livestock-breeding are the most important activities.

References

Communes in Arad County
Localities in Crișana